Cliniodes glaucescens is a moth in the family Crambidae. It was described by George Hampson in 1899. It is found in the eastern Andes, from Bolivia to Ecuador, as well as in Guatemala and Costa Rica.

References

Moths described in 1899
Eurrhypini